Jorrit Tornquist (born 26 March 1938) is an artist, a color consultant, and a color theorist. Originally he is Austrian and since 1992 he has obtained Italian citizenship.

Biography 
Born in Graz on 26 March 1938. 

Initially Tornquist studied biology. In 1958, at the Polytechnic University in Graz, he decided to take up architecture. Under the guidance of one professor named Winkler, Tornquist dedicated himself to both sculpting and painting, focusing on figurative.

Since 1959 he has focused on an in-depth study of color principles and color effects, and contemporarily launched his artistic career.

He has interest in the political and artistic movements that promote social transformation; he is a pacifist and refuses to carry out military service. He moved to Italy. Thanks to Getulio Alviani's help, he establishes himself in Sesto San Giovanni.

In 1966 he stages his first one-man show at the Vismara Gallery in Milan.

In the same year he takes part in the Forum Stadtpark in Graz. In 1967, together with Richard Kriesche and Helga Philipp, Tornquist signs the founding manifesto of the "Gruppo Austria", which aims to direct the Austrian culture towards new artistic languages.

Successively he sets up the Team Color Group (1972), becomes member of the Color Center of Tokyo (1974), actively participates in the Surya group (1977), theorized by the critic Enzo Biffi Gentili.

In parallel to his artistic practices, he starts his career as color consultant with a project for the Caffetteria dello Studente in Graz (1966, in collaboration with Arch. Jorg Mayr), then gradually he began to deal with important architectural sites, among which stands out the incineration plant in Brescia (1996).

In 1987 Jorrit Tornquist creates a performance titled "Apartheid" in Graz, his native town, with the intention to raise public awareness towards all living forms.

In 1992 he obtains Italian citizenship, though maintaining his Austrian one throughout.

In 1995 he builds up the Color & Surface group: Barcelona-Milano-Wien, that undertakes chromatic interventions for public and private projects.

Critical texts 

 U. Apollonio, Jorrit Tornquist, in Catalogo, Vismara Arte Contemporanea, Milano 1966.
 G. Dorfles, in Catalogo, Cenobio Visualità, Milano 1970.
 L. Caramel, in Catalogo, Vismara Arte Contemporanea, Milano 1971.
 W. Skreiner, in Catalogo di Farbe Empfindung Gefühlsraum, Neue Galerie, Graz 1973.
 G. Dorfles, Team colore, Milano 1974.
 E. Biffi Gentili, Libero da Gestalt?, in Tornquist 1959–78, Museo, Alessandria 1978.
 A. Veca, in Catalogo di Mostra Antologica, Pinacoteca Comunale, Macerata 1979.
 C. Belloli, in Colore come opposizione di luce-ombra dalle minicromie ai luciumbratili spazializzanti, Arte Struktura, Milano 1980.
 W. Skreiner, Continuità e apertura nell'opera di Jorrit Tornquist, 1980, in Catalogo della mostra Jorrit Tornquist 1959–1995, Studio F22, Palazzolo sull'Oglio 1995.
 E. Biffi Gentili, Introduzione, in J. Tornquist, Colore e luce, Hoepli Editrice, Milano 1983.
 W. Titz, Bagliori in una scatola di latta – Notizie su Tornquist, in Catalogo Jerseits von Farbe, Neue Galerie am Landesmuseum Joanneum, Graz 1987.
 E. Gombrich, L’apprendista stregone, Faenza 1990.
 A. Veca, 1990, in Catalogo della mostra Jorrit Tornquist 1959–1995, Studio F22, Palazzolo sull'Oglio 1995.
 W. Titz, Macule cieche, Graz 1993.
 E. Biffi Gentili, Jorrit Tornquist, o della vaghezza, 1994, in Catalogo della mostra Jorrit Tornquist 1959–1995, Studio F22, Palazzolo sull'Oglio 1995.

References 

1938 births
Living people
Austrian graphic designers
Artists from Graz